Nikolai Petrovich Morozov (Russian: Николай Петрович Морозов; 25 August 1916 – 13 October 1981) was a Russian football coach, who led the USSR national football team to a fourth-place finish in the 1966 FIFA World Cup.

External links 
  RussiaTeam biography

1916 births
1981 deaths
People from Lyubertsy
Russian footballers
Soviet footballers
FC Torpedo Moscow players
FC Spartak Moscow players
Russian football managers
Soviet football managers
Soviet Union national football team managers
FC Lokomotiv Moscow managers
1966 FIFA World Cup managers
FC Torpedo Moscow managers
FC Dnipro managers
FC Chornomorets Odesa managers
FC Shakhtar Donetsk managers
Association football midfielders
Sportspeople from Moscow Oblast